Ang Eng (1773 – 5 May 1796) was King of Cambodia from 1779 to his death in 1796. He reigned under the name of Neareay Reachea III.

Ang Eng was a son of Outey II. He was installed the Cambodian king by Prince Talaha (Mu) in 1780. Prince Talaha (Mu) acted as regent, and was pro-Vietnamese. Talaha rebelled against Siam, Taksin decided on an invasion of Cambodia. A Siamese army under Somdej Chao Phraya Maha Kasatsuek was dispatched to Cambodia, to crown Inthraphithak as the new king of Cambodia. However, a coup occurred in the same year. Maha Kasatsuek and Maha Surasi marched back to Siam. Later, Maha Kasatsuek was crowned as the new Siamese monarch and became King Rama I.

In 1782, the Tây Sơn dynasty of Vietnam attacked Gia Định and defeated the Nguyễn lord. The Vietnamese lost their control of Cambodia. Phraya Yommarat (Baen) and Phraya Kalahom (Su) captured Oudong and had Mu executed. Later, Baen killed Su and became the new regent. Cham rebels attacked Phnom Penh, and Ang Eng had to flee to Siam. Rama I had him captured and deported to Bangkok, where Rama I adopted him as his son. During the king's absence, Baen was promoted to Chaophraya Aphaiphubet, and was appointed the regent of Cambodia and thereby worked for Siam.

Ang Eng was installed as the king by the Siamese and sent back to Oudong. The Cambodian court split into two factions, as one supported Ang Eng and the other supported Baen. In order to prevent civil war in Cambodia, Rama I ordered Baen to leave Oudong. Battambang and Siem Reap were separated from Cambodia and ceded to Siam and Baen was appointed the governor of these provinces. 

Ang Eng died in 1796, his son Ang Chan II succeeded the throne.

Issue

Princess Moneang Aut
 Ang Chan
 Ang Snguon
Princess Moneang Ke
 Ang Phim
Princess Moneang Ros
 Ang Em
 Ang Duong

Notes

Sources 

 Achille Dauphin-Meunier Histoire du Cambodge Que sais-je ? N° 916, P.U.F Paris 1968.
 Anthony Stokvis, Manuel d'histoire, de généalogie et de chronologie de tous les États du globe, depuis les temps les plus reculés jusqu'à nos jours, préf. H. F. Wijnman, Israël, 1966, Chapitre XIV §.9 "Kambodge" Listes et tableau généalogique n°34 p. 337–338.
 Peter Truhart, Regents of Nations, K.G Saur Munich, 1984–1988, Art. " Kampuchea ", p. 1732.
 Khin Sok  "Quelques documents khmers relatifs aux relations entre le Cambodge et l'Annam en 1843". Dans : Bulletin de l'École française d'Extrême-Orient. Tome 74, 1985. p. 403–421.

18th-century Cambodian monarchs
Cambodian Buddhist monarchs
1796 deaths
1773 births